Louis Jones (born 12 October 1998) is an English professional footballer who plays as a goalkeeper for Doncaster Rovers.

Career
After coming through the youth system since being a 12 year old, Jones signed his first professional contract with Doncaster Rovers in March 2017. This was extended in March 2018, then further in January 2019 for 18 months, and again in July 2020, until 2022.

Following several loan moves, Jones made his first team debut in the EFL Trophy on 8 September 2020 against Bradford City, where he saved a penalty in the shoot out at the end of the 0–0 draw.

He played his first League game in the 2-1 Doncaster win over Portsmouth on 2 March 2021 as Andy Butler took over managing the team.

References

External links
 

1998 births
Living people
Footballers from Doncaster
English footballers
Association football goalkeepers
English Football League players
Doncaster Rovers F.C. players
Gainsborough Trinity F.C. players
Tadcaster Albion A.F.C. players
Sheffield F.C. players
Grantham Town F.C. players
Mickleover Sports F.C. players
Yeovil Town F.C. players